Abbeydore railway station was a station in Abbey Dore, Herefordshire, England. It was located on the Great Western Railway branch line linking Pontrilas and Hay-on-Wye. The area is known as the Golden Valley.

History

Opened by the Golden Valley Railway in 1881, the station closed and reopened three times in the next twenty years. It closed for the last time in 1941.

Just south before the station, via a level crossing, was the railway access point for the MoD's Elm Bridge Munitions Depot.

In 1901, traces of the Roman road which passed from Wroxeter to Abergavenny were found at the station.

References 

 Abbeydore station on navigable 1946 O. S. map

Further reading

Former Great Western Railway stations
Disused railway stations in Herefordshire
Railway stations in Great Britain opened in 1881
Railway stations in Great Britain closed in 1941
1881 establishments in England